Television in Afghanistan started broadcasting in August 1978, flourishing until the 1990s, when hostilities in the capital Kabul destroyed broadcasting infrastructure. Between 1996 and 2001, the Taliban government outlawed television, though some stations in areas outside Taliban control continued to broadcast. After their removal, country-wide television broadcasting was resumed beginning with the government-run channel Afghanistan National Television. It was reported that Afghanistan currently has over 200 local and international television channels, 96 in Kabul and 107 in other provinces of the country. In 2014, the country commenced a switch from analog to digital TV transmission.

History

The conceptual foundation of television in Afghanistan was first elucidated by Dr. Hafiz Sahar, chief editor of Eslah national daily newspaper, in his 1967 investigative academic work at New York University. He made compelling argument and advocated, based on other developing countries experiences, the need for television as an educational tool as well as practical solutions to initial technical problems of bringing television in Afghanistan, such as “Kabul itself is dominated by two high hills that make excellent natural broadcasting towers, thus, simplifying coverage problems”.

Technical and financial aid provided by the Japan International Cooperation Agency (JICA) kickstarted the construction work of the studio and transmitter buildings in 1976, with the work completed by August 1978. The state-owned Radio Television Afghanistan (RTA, previously just Radio Afghanistan) launched the first TV channel in Afghanistan at first broadcasting for two hours daily. During the 1980s, many Soviet programs were airing such as the children's show Nu Pogodi!. The studios of RTA were also often used by musicians to record music videos.

From 1992 onward television went into decline as a result of the war in Kabul, destroying infrastructure. During the Taliban government between 1996 and 2001, television was strictly banned—especially after 8 July 1998—and stores selling TVs, satellite dishes, VCRs, or other similar technology entertainment devices were closed. Anyone owning or watching TV was arrested and punished. The national television broadcaster was closed down, whilst private broadcasters' buildings and studios were smashed by the regime's police. A smaller territory that was controlled by the Northern Alliance in the country's northeast province of Badakhshan had a television channel financed by the Northern Alliance that broadcast, with a weak signal, news and movies to approximately 5,000 people in the city of Fayzabad. The station had a large library of movies and documentaries on VHS and Betamax for broadcasting, and the American movie First Blood was reportedly the most favored by watchers. Nonetheless, the station still had some levels of censorship, banning films containing women in swimsuits, singing or dancing (under the pressure of fundamentalists from the Northern Alliance), however gory and violent scenes were kept intact. The Betamax player that played most of the movies the station had was broken.

When the Karzai administration came to power in December 2001, Afghanistan's earliest television channel was relaunched. The transmission site at the summit of Asamayi was seriously damaged after the U.S. invasion, so the relaunched TV in Kabul was only transmitting from a 200 watt set. The JICA, who originally helped develop television in the 1970s, was consulted once again for redeveloping the transmitters. Later, Tolo and Shamshad TV became one of the first commercial TV stations in the country and laid the foundation for an accessible media outlet by offering a large library of shows.

In 2014, Afghanistan launched a pact with Eutelsat for a satellite, which was launched in 2014 as Afghansat 1 and transmits TV channels.

As of 2019, Afghanistan has over 200 local and international television channels, 96 in Kabul and 107 in other provinces of the country.

Since the Taliban ascend to power in August 2021, some media restrictions have been applied that have affected TV in Afghanistan. It was reported in November 2021 that they banned women from appearing in TV dramas. In March 2022 the Taliban banned stations from broadcasting localized Pashto or Dari language broadcasts from the BBC and VOA. Although no channels have been ordered to shut, a few stations decided to shut due to uncertainty or sudden lack of funding, including 3Sport which was the only channel dedicated to sports, and general entertainment channel Ayna TV. In May 2022, female presenters on TV were told to cover their faces.

Television ownership and viewership

According to The Asia Foundation's report "A Survey of the Afghan People in 2016", ownership of television is concentrated in urban areas, where electricity is more dependable and corresponds to increased household income. The central region (Kabul) exhibits the highest TV ownership, with 53.3% of households having one TV set, followed closely by the East and South West regions. Nearly two-thirds of Afghans (64.5%) report watching TV programs. Tolo was reported to be the most watched network, followed by Ariana Television Network, Shamshad TV, and Lemar.

Another study conducted by Gallup in 2015 found that Tolo was most popular with females, whereas the Afghanistan National Television (RTA) was most popular with males. Weekly TV viewing was highest in the north of the country, lowest in the east.

Transmission
In Afghanistan, many people watch TV through traditional analog terrestrial signals using (mostly indoor) antennas. It is the dominant method of watching TV in urban areas. Satellite transmission is much more common in rural areas than urban. Cable rates are low for both urban and rural.

In January 2013 Afghanistan's Ministry of Communication and Information Technology held a meeting with TV broadcasters on plans to switch from analog to digital transmission systems. Afghanistan has adopted the DVB-T2 standard and the switch-over would begin in Kabul.

On August 31, 2014, Afghanistan's digital terrestrial TV system called Oqaab was officially inaugurated by the second vice president of Afghanistan, H. E. Mohammad Karim Khalili, and Minister of Communications and Information Technology, H. E. Amirzai Sangin, in a ceremony at Kabul's Serena Hotel.

See also
Media in Afghanistan
List of radio stations in Afghanistan

External links
Afghanistan FTA satellite channels directory - Lyngsat
Watch Afghanistan TV Channels

References

 
Mass media in Afghanistan
Television